The Styrenes are an American proto-punk rock band, formed in Cleveland, Ohio in 1975, by former members of other local underground scene bands, electric eels and Mirrors.

Members
 Paul Marotta − vocals, guitar, piano
UK Rattay − guitar
Al Margolis − bass, vocals
John Keith − drums, vocals

Former members
Jamie Klimek − guitar, vocals
Paul Laurence − drums
Mike Hudson − vocals
Mike Hoffman − drums
Fred Lonberg-Holm − cello
John D Morton − guitar
Jim Jones − bass
Anton Fier − drums
David Newman - bass
Tim Moes - guitar

Discography
 Girl Crazy (Mustard MM 4401) 1982
Hudson/Styrene: A Monster And The Devil (Tinnitus 191305) 1989
 Re-released with bonus tracks as All the Wrong People Are Dying (Overground Records Over74) 1998
It's Artastic (Homestead Productions) 1991
We Care, So You Don't Have To (Scat Records Scat 63) 1998
It's Still Artastic (ROIR RUSCD 8276) 2002
In C - Terry Riley (Enja 9435) 2002City of Women'' (Rent A Dog bone 3010-2) 2007

See also
 Protopunk
 Electric Eels

References

Musical groups from Cleveland
Protopunk groups
Rock music groups from Ohio
1975 establishments in Ohio
Musical groups established in 1975